Carlos Villanueva may refer to:

 Carlos Villanueva (baseball) (born 1983), Major League Baseball relief pitcher
 Carlos Villanueva (equestrian) (born 1918), Argentine Olympic equestrian
 Carlos Villanueva (footballer) (born 1986), Chilean football player
 Carlos Villanueva López (born 1994), Mexican football player
 Carlos Raúl Villanueva (1900–1975), Venezuelan architect